Jai Ganesh (1946 – 11 February 2001) was an Indian actor who appeared in Tamil plays and films. He had supporting roles in the films  Aval Oru Thodar Kathai and Aattukara Alamelu, among others. His most popular roles have been as a supporting actor or as a villain in films such as Thaayillamal Naan Illai (1979) and Athisaya Piravi (1990).

He was introduced into the film industry by director K. Balachander in Aval Oru Thodar Kathai. From then on, he acted in many films as hero and also as character actor. Some of his famous films in 1970s are Neeya, Pilot Premnath, Vattathukkul Sathuram and Vanakathukuriya Kathaliyae& Azhage unnai Aradhikkiren.

Jai Ganesh died of cancer on 11 February 2001, at the age of 54. He acted in lot of movies as hero as well as in supporting roles with famous actors including Sivaji Ganesan, Jaishankar, Sivakumar, Muthuraman, Rajinikanth, Kamal Haasan, Vijayakanth, Sathyaraj, Karthik, Ajith Kumar, Vijay and Master Raghu.

Notable Tamil filmography
This list is incomplete; you can help by expanding it.

 Aval Oru Thodar Kathai (1974)
 Thennangkeetru (1975)
 Veeduvarai Uravu (1976)
 Akka (1976)
 Maharasi Vazhga (1976)
 Manamaara Vazhthungal (1976)
 Mutthana Mutthullavo (1976)
 Ungalil Oruthi (1976)
 Annan Oru Koyil (1977)
 Aattukara Alamelu (1977)
 Pattina Pravesam (1977)
 Bala Paritchai (1977)
 Athaivida Ragasiyam (1978)
 Shankar Salim Simon (1978)
 Meenakshi Kungumam (1978)
 Pilot Premnath (1978)
 Sonnadhu Nee Thanaa (1978)
 Vayasu Ponnu (1978)
 Kungumam Kadhai Sollugiradhu (1978)
 Varuvan Vadivelan (1978)
 Kannan Oru Kai Kuzhandhai (1978)
 Vanakkatukuriya Kathaliye (1978)
 Neeya? (1979)
 Anbe Sangeetha (1979)
 Lakshmi (1979)
 Mambazhathu Vandu (1979)
 Pappathi (1979)
 Suprabadham (1979)
 Devathai (1979)
 Thirisoolam (1979)
 Velum Mayilum Thunai (1979)
 Thevaigal (1979)
 Naan Vazhavaippen (1979)
 Thaayillamal Naan Illai (1979)
 Gnana Kuzhandhai (1979)
 Imayam (1979)
 Azhage Unnai Aarathikkiren (1979)
 Geetha Oru Shenbagapoo (1980)
 Ratha Paasam (1980)
 Muzhu Nilavu (1980)
 Ore Mutham (1980)
 Oru Marathu Paravaigal (1980)
 Mangala Nayagi (1980)
 Sorgathin Thirappu Vizha (1981)
 Sathya Sundharam (1981)
 Lorry Driver Rajakannu (1981)
 Thiruppangal (1981)
 Erattai Manithan (1982)
 Nayakkirin Magal (1982)
 Thambathyam Oru Sangeetham (1982)
 Thaai Mookaambikai (1982)
 Vaa Kanna Vaa (1982)
 Aval Oru Kaviyam (1983)
 Yamirukka Bayamen (1983)
 Chiranjeevi (1984)
 Nalla Naal (1984)
 Chinna Veedu (1985)
 Samaya Purathale Satchi (1985)
 Aagaya Thamaraigal (1985)
 Nambinar Keduvathillai (1986)
 Dharma Devathai (1986)
 Thazhuvatha Kaigal (1986)
 Melmaruvathur Arputhangal (1986)
 Velundu Vinaiyillai (1987)
 Veeran Veluthambi (1987)
 Enga Ooru Pattukaran (1987)
 Enga Chinna Rasa (1987)
 Per Sollum Pillai (1987)
 Manithan (1987)
 Anbulla Appa (1987)
 Kavithai Paada Neramillai (1987)
 Thaye Neeye Thunai (1987)
 Thaimel Aanai (1988)
 Kai Koduppal Karpagambal (1988)
 Puthiya Vaanam (1988)
 Kunguma Kodu (1988)
 Thambi Thanga Kambi (1988)
 Thenpandi Seemayile (1989)
 Uzhaithu Vaazha Vendum (1988)
 Sigappu Thali (1988)
 Raja Chinna Roja (1989)
 Pen Puthi Mun Puthi (1989)
 Thendral Sudum (1989)
 Kai Veesamma Kai Veesu (1989)
 Dravidan (1989)
 Naalaiya Manithan (1989)
 Vaai Kozhuppu (1989)
 Meenakshi Thiruvilayadal (1989)
 Aararo Aariraro (1989)
 Athisaya Piravi (1990)
 Mounam Sammadham (1990)
 Kalyana Rasi (1990)
 Arangetra Velai (1990)
 Thalattu Padava (1990)
 Ulagam Pirandhadhu Enakkaga (1990)
 En Veedu En Kanavar (1990)
 Namma Ooru Poovatha (1990)
 Urudhi Mozhi (1990)
 Vaazhkai Chakkaram (1990)
 Thangamana Thangachi (1991)
 Vetri Padigal (1991)
 Mahamayee (1991)
 Ayul Kaithi (1991)
 Apoorva Naagam (1991)
 Nattukku Oru Nallavan (1991)
 Nallathai Naadu Kekum (1991)
 Naalaiya Theerpu (1992)
 Brahmachari (1992)
 Solaiyamma (1992)
 Naalaya Seidhi (1992)
 Innisai Mazhai (1992)
 Periya Gounder Ponnu (1992)
 Mudhal Kural (1992)
 Maharasan (1993)
 Rajadhi Raja Raja Kulothunga Raja Marthanda Raja Gambeera Kathavaraya Krishna Kamarajan (1993)
 Rasa Magan (1994)
 Sakthivel (1994)
 Seeman (1994)
 Watchman Vadivel (1994)
 Nila (1994)
 Veluchami (1995)
 Murai Maman (1995)
 Poove Unakkaga (1996)
 Meendum Savithri (1996)
 Maanbumigu Maanavan (1996)
 Vetri Vinayagar (1996)
 Thuraimugam (1996)
 Andha Naal (1996)
 Ullathai Allitha (1996)
 Suryavamsam (1997)
 Udhavikku Varalaamaa (1998)
 Swarnamukhi (1998)
 Thulli Thirintha Kaalam (1998)
 Iniyavale (1998)
 Priyamudan (1998)
 Nilaave Vaa (1998)
 Pudhumai Pithan (1998)
 Unnai Thedi (1999)
 Ullathai Killathe (1999)
 Viralukketha Veekkam (1999)
 Rojavanam (1999)
 Malabar Police (1999)
 Nee Varuvai Ena (1999)
 Anbulla Kadhalukku (1999)
 Unakkaga Ellam Unakkaga (1999)
 Unnaruge Naan Irundhal (1999)
 Manam Virumbuthe Unnai (1999)
 Mugavaree (2000) Unnai Kann Theduthey (2000)
 Maayi (2000) 
 Alli Arjuna (2002) (delayed release)
 Ennai Thalatta Varuvala (2003) (delayed release)

Notable Television Works
 1999 Kasalavu Nesam as Rathi's Father
 2000 Jannal-Marabu Kavithaigal  (Cameo Appearance)

References

Tamil male actors
1946 births
Indian male film actors
Place of birth missing
Deaths from cancer in India
2001 deaths
Date of birth missing